"Send in Stewie, Please" is the twelfth episode of the sixteenth season of the animated sitcom Family Guy, and the 301st episode overall. It aired on Fox in the United States on March 18, 2018 with limited commercial interruption due to its runtime of 25 minutes, and is written by Gary Janetti and directed by Joe Vaux.

The episode largely focuses on Stewie Griffin (voiced by creator Seth MacFarlane) about his major secrets, accompanied by a child psychologist (voiced by guest star Ian McKellen). None of the Griffin family appear except Brian at the very end, and no cutaway gags accompany the extended runtime. In addition, this episode was commercial-free so that Fox could promote the 2018 God of War video game.

Plot
At Quahog Preschool, Stewie is sent to the office of Dr. Cecil Pritchfield, a child psychologist. Stewie begins the therapy session by making observational small talk. He then starts to talk proudly about his British accent, but the psychologist says that he cannot hear it, much to Stewie's annoyance.

When the doctor tells him he feels he knows him a bit after only a few minutes in his company, Stewie picks up a photograph of him on vacation with his husband Michael. Stewie begins to analyze their relationship in remarkable detail, revealing Pritchfield's embarrassment and insecurity about being much older than his husband. The psychologist then observes that Stewie is very lonely, at which Stewie suddenly bursts into tears, as Pritchfield's aide Barbara hands him some tissues.

After Stewie regains composure, Pritchfield mentions the incident that brought Stewie to his office, in which he pushed a classmate, Tyler, down the stairs. Stewie protests that he only did it because he liked Tyler and was afraid he would not like him back. Stewie denies being gay and declares that he is "confident" in his heterosexuality. He also expresses his difficulty fitting in when none of the other boys share his interests in musicals and world domination. He admits to pulling out his own hair because of anxiety, and expresses frustration at not being able to be on Broadway. He then performs to Pritchfield part of a number from the musical Hamilton, while fighting hiccups and a runny nose.

Stewie takes up an offer of tea and Pritchfield begins to tell him of his own youth as an orphan in Britain during the Second World War. Stewie interrupts his long story and they return to discussing Stewie's differences and difficulty fitting in. Stewie admits that he has constructed a persona in order to hide his true self, and drops his British accent, revealing his true accent to have been American all along. He makes plans to reveal his true self to others as well, but reconsiders and reverts to his British accent when he faces being just like everyone else.

Suddenly, Pritchfield starts to have a heart attack. He asks Stewie to hand him his heart medication, but Stewie, aware that Pritchfield is the only one who has seen through his façade, lets him die, even as the doctor warns that if he does so, it will stay with him. Pritchfield calls out to Barbara, but Stewie points out that she has already gone to lunch. As he dies, the doctor picks up the photo of himself with his husband and recites lines from Romeo and Juliet. Immediately after his death with Stewie still present, Pritchfield's office receives a voicemail from Michael demanding a divorce where Michael is unaware that Pritchfield is dead.

Later that night, Stewie wakes up screaming, plagued by guilt over his actions as Pritchfield had warned, and asks Brian to sleep in his bed with him. He mentions that he has done something awful, though he does not explain further. As Brian falls asleep, Stewie lies awake, disturbed and unsure whether his experience with Pritchfield was real or just a dream.

Reception

The episode was watched by 2.24 million viewers. Gary Janetti was nominated for a Writers Guild of America Award for Outstanding Writing in Animation at the 71st Writers Guild of America Awards for his script to this episode.

References

External links

 

2018 American television episodes
Family Guy (season 16) episodes
American LGBT-related television episodes
LGBT-related animated television episodes
Two-handers
Child psychologists